James Richards may refer to:

 James Richards (artist) (born 1983), British artist
 James Richards (Canadian football) (born 1969), American football offensive guard
 James Richards (cricketer) (1855–1923), English cricketer
 James Richards (politician) (1723–1810), Revolutionary War Captain and Connecticut state representative
 James Richards (veterinarian) (1948–2007), American veterinarian and noted expert on cats
 James A. D. Richards (1845–1911), United States Representative from Ohio
 James Maude Richards (1907–1992), British architectural writer
 James P. Richards (1894–1979), United States Representative from South Carolina
 James William Richards (1850–1915), Canadian politician
 James Edwin Richards (1945–2000), American journalist, editor and publisher
 James Lorin Richards (1858–1955), American financier and industrialist
 James Richard (1928–2002), sound editor, sometimes as James A. Richards
 Jamie Richards (cyclist) (born 1957), cyclist from New Zealand

See also 
 Jim Richards (disambiguation)
 Richard James (disambiguation)
 Jimmy Richards (born 1975), Welsh rugby player
 Jamie Richards (footballer) (born 1994), English footballer
 Jamie Richards (horse trainer) New Zealand thoroughbred racehorse trainer